Thuja koraiensis, also called Korean arborvitae, is a species of Thuja, native to Korea and the extreme northeast of China (Changbaishan). Its current status is poorly known; the small population in China is protected in the Changbaishan Nature Reserve, as is the small population in Soraksan Nature Reserve in northern South Korea, but most of the species' range in North Korea is unprotected and threatened by habitat loss.

It is an evergreen shrub or small tree growing to 3–10 m tall. The foliage forms flat sprays with scale-like leaves 2–4 mm long (up to 15 mm long on strong-growing shoots), matt dark green above, and with broad, vivid white stomatal wax bands below. The cones are oval, yellow-green ripening red-brown, 7–11 mm long and 4–5 mm broad (opening to 6–9 mm broad), with 8-12 overlapping scales.

It is occasionally grown as an ornamental tree for the contrast between the green upper and bright white lower sides of the foliage, though planting is limited by the low availability of seeds.

References

Koraiensis
Trees of Korea
Trees of China
Vulnerable flora of Asia
Taxa named by Takenoshin Nakai
Taxonomy articles created by Polbot
Plants described in 1919